The Fort Hamilton Parkway station is a local station on the IND Culver Line of the New York City Subway. It is served by the F and G trains at all times.

This underground station, opened on October 7, 1933, has two tracks and two side platforms. The Culver Line's express tracks run underneath the station and are not visible from the platforms.

History 
One of the goals of Mayor John Hylan's Independent Subway System (IND), proposed in the 1920s, was a line to Coney Island, reached by a recapture of the BMT Culver Line. As originally designed, service to and from Manhattan would have been exclusively provided by Culver express trains, while all local service would have fed into the IND Crosstown Line. The line was extended from Bergen Street to Church Avenue on October 7, 1933, including the Fort Hamilton Parkway station.

The IND Culver Line's Church Avenue and Fort Hamilton Parkway stations were the last underground stations to get fluorescent lighting on platform level, which replaced the incandescent lighting in 1987.

Service patterns 
The station was originally served by the A train. In 1936, the A was rerouted to the IND Fulton Street Line and was replaced by E trains from the Queens Boulevard Line. Following the completion of the Culver Ramp in 1954,  Concourse Express trains replaced F service to Coney Island. In November 1967, the Chrystie Street Connection opened and D trains were rerouted via the Manhattan Bridge and the BMT Brighton Line to Coney Island. F trains were extended once again via the Culver Line.

The station acted as a local-only station from 1968 to 1976, when F trains ran express in both directions between Bergen Street and Church Avenue during rush hours. G trains were extended from Smith–Ninth Streets to Church Avenue to provide local service. Express service between Bergen and Church ended in 1976 due to budgetary concerns and passenger complaints, and the GG, later renamed the G, was again terminated at the Smith–Ninth Streets station.

In July 2009, the G was extended from its long-time terminus at Smith–Ninth Streets to a more efficient terminus at Church Avenue to accommodate the rehabilitation of the Culver Viaduct. The G extension was made permanent in July 2012. In July 2019, the MTA revealed plans to restore express service on the Culver Line between Jay Street and Church Avenue. Express service started on September 16, 2019.

Station layout

There are two local tracks and two side platforms. The express tracks run under the station and are not visible from the platforms.

Both platforms have an orange-yellow trim line with a medium red-brown border and mosaic name tablets reading "FT. HAMILTON PKWAY." in white sans-serif lettering on a red-brown background and orange-yellow border. There are several replacement tiles in bright orange-red throughout the station. Below the trim line are tile captions in white lettering on a black background reading "FT HAMILTON PKWAY", and below some of the name tablet mosaics are directional tile captions. Wide columns run along the platforms at regular intervals, alternating ones having the standard black name plate with white lettering.

South of this station, on the express tracks on the lower level, there are bellmouths for a proposed subway line along Fort Hamilton Parkway and/or the parallel Tenth Avenue. After diverging into two lines at around 65th Street, the mainline would have terminated at 86th Street in Bay Ridge, and the other line would travel west from the mainline towards a partially-built tunnel to Staten Island. An alternate plan proposed a connection to the BMT West End Line at New Utrecht Avenue. These lines were planned as part of the IND Second System.

Exits
The full-time, northern entrance is by Greenwood and Prospect Avenues, with two street staircases. A block-long passageway leads northward to the northeast corner of Prospect Avenue and Reeve Place for one additional street staircase. There is a closed staircase that would have led to a fare control area at platform level at the Manhattan-bound side. This area is gated shut, and about half of the space is taken by station facilities with additional tiles.

At the north end of the station, there is also a sealed entrance at the northwestern corner of Reeve Place and Prospect Avenue, which was never opened. The property owner of 1246 Prospect Avenue filed a suit, claiming that it obstructed access to their property, which was scheduled to be tried on January 20, 1936. Since the New York City Board of Transportation deemed that it would probably not be needed for a considerable period, it ordered that the closure of the stairway, the removal the entrance structure, and the slabbing over of the entrance be done at once. The report stated that the entrance could be reopened at its former location with the consent of the owner, or at the curb line, without their consent, when "traffic warrants reopening".

The south end exit is to Fort Hamilton Parkway and has full-time HEET access and a former booth. The only exit at this end is a ramp (no staircase) that runs along the western side of the Prospect Expressway, up and down a small hill. This exit replaced the original 1933 staircase exit, when Robert Moses built the expressway. From the mezzanine area, one can see the variation in tile colors and styles when the new entrance was added in 1962, coinciding with the opening of the expressway. This can be seen when facing the ramp.

References

External links 

 
 Station Reporter — F Train
 The Subway Nut — Fort Hamilton Parkway Pictures
 Fort Hamilton Parkway entrance from Google Maps Street View
 Greenwood and Prospect Avenues entrance from Google Maps Street View
 Reeve Place entrance from Google Maps Street View
 Platforms from Google Maps Street View

1933 establishments in New York City
IND Culver Line stations
New York City Subway stations in Brooklyn
Railway stations in the United States opened in 1933